Hips and Makers is the debut solo album by Kristin Hersh, best known as the primary singer and songwriter of the band Throwing Muses. The album was released by 4AD in the UK on January 24, 1994, and by Sire Records in the US on February 1, 1994. In contrast to Hersh's rock-oriented work with Throwing Muses, the album is primarily acoustic, with Hersh usually playing unaccompanied. Other credited musicians include Jane Scarpantoni on cello and Michael Stipe of R.E.M., who sings backing vocals on the opening track, "Your Ghost." In addition to Hersh's own material, the album features a cover of the traditional song "The Cuckoo".

"It's personal, literally so," Hersh said, "Full of skin and coffee, shoes and sweat and babies and sex and food and stores – just stupid stuff that's really a big deal."

The album peaked at #7 in the UK Album Charts, the highest placing of any of Hersh's offerings on her own or with Throwing Muses. The album peaked at #197 on the US's Billboard 200 Albums Chart. It also peaked at #10 on the US's Billboard Heatseekers Album Chart.

Reception

Critics were mostly positive about Hips and Makers on its release. "It's clear that a Belly-style pop accommodation is just not what Hersh is aiming for," observed David Cavanagh in Select. "Her peers are [Bob] Mould and, more particularly, Michael Stipe."' "She is as accomplished a singer/songwriter as [Tanya] Donnelly," noted James Delingpole in The Sunday Telegraph. "The only place where it falls down is that the arrangements are so sparse (it's just Hersh on acoustic guitar or piano with the odd bit of cello accompaniment – very Suzanne Vega) that the songs, though cute, all start to sound a bit samey."

Spins Simon Reynolds raved that "[a]t once oppressive and impressive, [it] signals a rejuvenation for Hersh's muse", while Rolling Stones Stephanie Zacharek called it "[l]uminous, alluring and slightly menacing". On the other hand, Robert Christgau was neutral and didn't write anything about it beyond that. "Despite the delicate good looks of 'Velvet Days' and the title track," decided Andrew Collins in Q, "it advances the Hersh cause for acceptance no further."

AllMusic critic Richie Unterberger was more positive, noting the material was of an "intensely personal nature" and offered with "a despairing and introspective tone that fails to submerge her considerable inner strength and fortitude".

Track listing
All tracks composed by Kristin Hersh; except where indicated

"Your Ghost"  – 3:16
"Beestung"  – 3:08
"Teeth"  – 4:10
"Sundrops"  – 4:02
"Sparky"  – 1:29
"Houdini Blues" (Kristin Hersh, William James Hersh) – 4:26
"A Loon"  – 4:18
"Velvet Days"  – 3:52
"Close Your Eyes"  – 5:27
"Me and My Charms"  – 4:16
"Tuesday Night"  – 3:03
"The Letter"  – 2:47
"Lurch"  – 0:36
"The Cuckoo" (traditional; arranged by Kristin Hersh) – 2:12
"Hips and Makers"  – 3:19

Personnel
Kristin Hersh – guitar, vocals
Jane Scarpantoni – cello
Michael Stipe – additional vocals on "Your Ghost"
Technical
Phill Brown – engineer
Steve Rizzo – assistant engineer
Vaughan Oliver – design
Shinro Ohtake – artwork
Andrew Catlin – photography

References

External links
 'Hips and Makers' page at 4AD
 Lyrics at alwaysontherun

 Hips and Makers at Myspace (streamed copy where licensed)

1994 debut albums
Kristin Hersh albums
4AD albums
Sire Records albums
Albums produced by Lenny Kaye